The UEFA European Under-18 Championship 1974 Final Tournament was held in Sweden.

Qualification

Groups 1-10

|}

Group 11

Group 12

Teams
The following teams qualified for the tournament:

 
 
 
  (received Bye for qualifying stage)
 
 
  (received Bye for qualifying stage)
 
 
 
 
 
  (host)
  (received Bye for qualifying stage)

Group stage

Group A

Group B

Group C

Group D

Semifinals

Third place match

Final

External links
Results by RSSSF

UEFA European Under-19 Championship
1974
Under-18
1974 in Swedish football
May 1974 sports events in Europe
1974 in youth association football